A statue of Edward Jenner, the physician, scientist and pioneer of the world's first vaccine, is located in Kensington Gardens in London. A work of the sculptor William Calder Marshall, the bronze was originally unveiled by Albert, Prince Consort in Trafalgar Square on 17 May 1858, before being moved to its present location in 1862. It is a Grade II listed building.

The statue depicts Jenner in a seated position with one hand holding papers and is upon a plinth of Portland stone with Jenner's surname inscribed on a front panel of Aberdeen granite. At the base of the plinth is the inscription 'W. Calder Marshall, R. A. Sculpt. 1858'. A descriptive bronze plaque is set into the ground in front of the statue and it reads:

In 1853, the year that United Kingdom legislated for compulsory vaccination, the sculptor Calder Marshall gained attention from the medical community for his bust of Jenner which was shown at The Great Exhibition in1851, and a public fund to establish a London memorial was launched. International donations were generous, but the British public were less supportive, and Caldwell Marshall was left 'seriously out of pocket'. Despite this, the finished statue, unveiled by Queen Victoria's consort, Prince Albert, was a 'triumph for the vaccinationist cause'.

The prominent memorial was opposed by anti-vaccinationists, but even more strongly by the military, as Trafalgar Square, in 1858, only included statues of notable military figures. As a newspaper at the time suggested '...the veterans of the Horse Guards and Admiralty were scandalised at the idea of a mere civilian, a doctor, having a place in such distinguished company, and moreover daring to be seated while his betters were standing'.

Despite calls by The Times, and in Parliament, for Jenner's statue to be moved, with royal support it remained in place until two months after the death of the Prince Consort in December, 1861. In 1862, commenting on events, the British Medical Journal compared the military statues to Jenner, and noted that they remained in Trafalgar Square 'because they killed their fellow creatures whereas he only saved them'.

A proposal to return the statue to a more prominent location was suggested in a letter to The Times in 1923, and again in 1937. In 2010, the 30th anniversary of the eradication of smallpox that began with Jenner's vaccine, a new campaign to return the statue to Trafalgar Square began.

References

External links
 

1858 sculptures
Bronze sculptures in the United Kingdom
Jenner, Edward
Monuments and memorials in London
Outdoor sculptures in London
Jenner, Edward
Kensington Gardens